Li Xiang (born September 1967) is a Chinese electronic information expert, major general, and member of the Chinese Academy of Sciences. He is the current president of the National University of Defense Technology, in office since December 2019.

Biography 
Li was born in the town of Beisheng, Liuyang County, Hunan, in September 1967. In December 2019, he took office as president of National University of Defense Technology, succeeding Deng Xiaogang.

Honours and awards 
 18 November 2021 Member of the Chinese Academy of Sciences (CAS)

References 

1967 births
Living people
People from Liuyang
Scientists from Hunan
Presidents of the National University of Defense Technology
People's Liberation Army generals from Hunan
Members of the Chinese Academy of Sciences